The Immediate Geographic Region of Aimorés-Resplendor is one of the 4 immediate geographic regions in the Intermediate Geographic Region of Governador Valadares, one of the 70 immediate geographic regions in the Brazilian state of Minas Gerais and one of the 509 of Brazil, created by the National Institute of Geography and Statistics (IBGE) in 2017.

Municipalities 
It comprises 5 municipalities.

 Aimorés  
 Cuparaque  
 Itueta   
 Resplendor  
 Santa Rita do Itueto

References 

Geography of Minas Gerais